The 2013–14 FC Basel season was the 121st season in the club's history and the club's 19th consecutive season in the top flight of Swiss football.

Basel started the season as were the reigning champions of the Super League champions. They commenced the season with a number of friendly matches against teams from Switzerland, Serbia and Germany. Their league campaign on 13 July with a home tie against FC Aarau. After the first six games, they occupied the fourth position in the league table, six points behind the leader Young Boys Bern. Beating the Young Boys in the seventh round, Basel then went on an unbeaten run of 29 league game, which lead them to their fifth league title in a row. Their campaign in the 2013–14 Swiss Cup began with the first round on 17 August with an away game against BSC Old Boys, which they won after extra time. They also defeated FC Münsingen, FC Tuggen, FC Le Mont and FC Luzern en route to the final, which they lost 2-0 against FC Zürich.

Basel's campaign in the 2013–14 UEFA Champions League started on July 30, 2013 in the third qualifying round with the tie in St. Jakob-Park against Maccabi Tel Aviv. After defeating Maccabi, they defeated Ludogorets Razgrad in the play-off round and qualified for the group stage. They were placed in Group E alongside Chelsea, Schalke 04 and Steaua București. Basel finished in third position in the league table and, thus, qualified for the 2013–14 UEFA Europa League round of 32, where they reached the quarter-finals, only to be knocked-out by Valencia.

Club

FC Basel Holding AG
The FC Basel Holding AG (Holding) owns 75% of the club FC Basel (FC Basel 1893 AG) and the other 25% is owned by the club and its members. Chairman of the Holding was Bernhard Heusler, the finance chief was Stephan Werthmüller and Sportdirector was Georg Heitz. As chairman of the Holding Heusler was also chairman of the club.

Club management
At the AGM the existing board of directors under president Bernhard Heusler with vice-president Adrian Knup, sportdirector Georg Heitz, financial manager Stephan Werthmüller and marketing manager René Kamm, and the three directors Reto Baumgartner, Dominik Donzé and Benno Kaiser were willing to continue as before. They were all re-elected unanimously.

Team management 
First team manager in this season was Murat Yakin. His assistants were Marco Walker and Markus Hoffmann and Massimo Colomba was the Goalkeeper coach. Massimo Ceccaroni was appointed as head of the FCB Youth System. Coach of the Youth Team (U–21) was Thomas Häberli.

Overview

Offseason and preseason
Basel's biggest signings at the beginning of the season were two players who had already played for the club in recent years, Behrang Safari, who returned from RSC Anderlecht, and Matías Delgado who was signed on a free transfer from al-Jazira Club. A further player who rejoined the squad was Taulant Xhaka who had been on loan to the Grasshoppers. A further signing was Giovanni Sio from VfL Wolfsburg and the another main signing was Ivan Ivanov who transferred in from Partizan

In the other direction, Aleksandar Dragović who transferred to Dynamo Kyiv. Park Joo-Ho left the club and signed for 1. FSV Mainz 05. Gilles Yapi Yapo's contract came to an end and he transferred to Dubai CSC. Three further players, Cabral went to Sunderland AFC, Markus Steinhöfer signed for Real Betis and Jacques Zoua went to Hamburger SV. All three left the club on free transfers. 

Also, no longer in the squad was Alexander Frei who retired from his active playing career. Between the years from 1997 to 1998 and again from 2009 to 2013 Frei played a total of 217 games for Basel scoring a total of 148 goals. 114 of these games were in the Swiss Super League, 15 in the Swiss Cup, 38 in the European competitions (Champions League and Europa League) and 50 were friendly games. He scored 74 goals in the domestic league, 13 in the cup, 22 in the European matches and the other 39 were scored during the test games. With the club he won four league championships and two cup titles.

Midseason
In August Raul Bobadilla (following a personal incident with the traffic police) was sold off, in a hurry and cheap, to Augsburg into the Bundesliga.

Winter break
During the winter break Basel met an agreement with Aarau and the players Davide Callà (in) and Stephan Andrist (out) were exchanged. Another important change was that Mohamed Salah transferred out to Chelsea for an estimated £13 Million. Basel also made an agreement with Spartak Moscow, receiving centre back Marek Suchý on loan until the end of the season.

The Campaign

Domestic league
The club's priority aim for the first team in this season was to win the league championship for the fifth time in a row. Basel's 2013–14 Swiss Super League season began on 13 July 2013 with the away tie against FC Aarau which was won 3–1. Basel are renowned for their slow starts into the new season and following two home wins and two away draws they promptly lost their third home match against FC Zürich 1–2. After the first six games they occupied only fourth position in the league table, six points behind the then leader Young Boys Bern, who they beat 2–1 in the seventh round. 

At this point Basel started a run of 28 league games without defeat. After the following six games, five wins and a draw, by the twelfth round Basel had turned the table and took the lead in the table by two points ahead of the Grasshoppers. As it came to the winter break Basel were table leaders one point above Luzern. The good run continued in the spring session and lasted until 11 May as they were defeated in the Stade de Suisse by Young Boys who with the victory secured their qualification to the next season's Europa League. However, toward the end of the season, due to the large number of players who were out because of an injury, head coach Murat Yakin was put under pressure by the club bosses.

Conclusion
At the end of the season Basel won the league championship seven points clear of their nearest rivals Grasshopper Club. Thus, Basel achieved their main priority aim that they had set for the season. This was their seventeenth title and the fifth title in a row. They had secured 19 victories, 15 draws and suffered only two defeats. The team had scored 72 goals, conceded 34 and had a positive goal difference of 26. But at the end of the season, it was announced that the contract with Yakin would not be extended.

In the league top scorer was Valentin Stocker with 13 goals in 30 outings. Second position in the statics was Marco Streller with 10 goals in 25 outings and third was Giovanni Sio with 9 goals in 23 games.

Domestic Cup 
Basel entered the 2013–14 Swiss Cup in the first round of the competition. Having been runners-up in the previous season, the club's clear aim for the team was for them to win the title. In the first round, teams from the Super League and Challenge League were seeded and could not play against each other. In a match, the home advantage was granted to the team from the lower league, if applicable. 

Old Boys (17 August 2013)
Basel were drawn against local amateur club Old Boys who at that time played in the 1. Liga Promotion the third tier of the Swiss football league system. FCB had to go into extra time against first division club Old Boys at their grounds Stadion Schützenmatte. FCB only prevailed 1–0 thanks to a header from the newly signed Bulgarian Ivan Ivanov in the 95th minute and this despite the fact that from the 63rd minute (yellow/red card against Akdemir) played with one man more. The Old Boys were by no means inferior to their big brother in front of the 4,384 spectators. The lower-class team could even lament bad luck, because they had three shots that landed on the woodwork, the FCB "only" two. The FCB left an unimaginative impression. It was left to defender Ivan Ivanov after the ninth corner to score the decisive goal with a header. Matías Delgado, who otherwise remained pale, did the preparatory work.

Münsingen (14 September 2013)
In the second round of the Cup the teams from the Super League were seeded and could not play each other. In the matches the home advantage was granted to the team from the lower league. Basel were drawn against FC Münsingen, who at that time played in the 1. Liga the fourth tier of Swiss football. Murat Yakin's team was - to put it politely - in economy mode with regard to the upcoming first task in the Champions League (away against Chelsea). In Münsingen, where the local club claimed a stadium record with 4,100 spectators, a 1–0 win was enough for Basel. The visitors had earned this with a minimalist performance. A penalty goal by Matías Delgado was enough to seal the victory and to advance to the next round. Despite everything, the Argentine was able to celebrate his first goal, in his eighth outing, since returning to FCB. Delgado moved into the team because the head coach spared various regular starters in front of the Champions League kick-off.

Tuggen (10 November 2013)
As in the previous round, in the third round the teams from the Super League were seeded and could not play each other. In the matches the home advantage was granted to the team from the lower league. Basel were drawn against FC Tuggen who at that time played in the 1. Liga Promotion, the third tier. With Valentin Stocker, Mohamed Salah and Taulent Xhaka, coach Yakin nominated only three players who were also in the starting line-up in the Champions League on the Wednesday before. Despite this, FCB jumped over the cup hurdle in Tuggen in their stadium Linthstrasse, on the wet terrain, easier than expected. After a goalless first half, it was enough for them to step up the pace to mark two goals within five minutes. The preliminary decision in front of 6,250 spectators was brought about by Mohamed Salah on 52 minutes and the strong playing Giovanni Sio on 57 minutes. The Kosovar Tuggen centre forward Veton Krasniqi gave courage to the brave fighting and never giving up Tuggen with his consolation goal, but the Chilean Marcelo Diaz stifled hopes with the 3–1 after 81 minutes. During the first half, Tuggen were able to keep up to some extent, but as their strength waned and FCB increased the pressure and pace, the differences became apparent.

Le Mont  (5 February 2014)
The winners of Round 3 played in the quarter-finals. The ties were drawn, there was no home advantage granted in the draw. Basel were drawn away against Le Mont, who at that time played in the third tier of Swiss football. Originally scheduled to be played in Le Mont-sur-Lausanne against FC Le Mont on 4 December 2013. However, the game was postponed due to weather conditions and an unplayable pitch, the game was postponed and later rescheduled to be played in St. Jakob-Park, on 5 February 2014, but remaining as a home tie for Le Mont. 

Basel had the game under control from the first minutes. Goals from Stephan Andrist and Marek Suchý in the 7th and 9th minutes gave Basel a comfortable early lead. Marco Streller added a third just before half time. After the break Fabian Frei, David Degen and again Andrist gave the favourites a six-goal lead. Two minutes before the final whistle Sid-Ahmed Bouziane scored a consolation goal for the lower-class team.

Luzern (26 March 2014)
In the semi-final Basel were drawn at home against Luzern. Seen over the entire duration of the game, the favoured FCB team were more active and more confident in style. They recorded a plus in chances and should have seized the lead earlier due to a few hundred percent opportunities. In their strongest phase between the 20th and 40th minute, however, they never got the ball past the strong FCL keeper David Zibung, or else a teammate saved for the defeated goalkeeper. Fabian Frei, Fabian Schär and Serey Die came closest from favourable positions during this period. Davide Callà scored the decisive goal in the 80th minute. The attacking midfielder, who only joined the team from Aarau in February, netted from the most acute of angles. The preparatory work was done by full-back Philipp Degen, who headed the ball on after a cross from Serey Die. After that FCL were unable to react. The 1–0 victory for FCB was deserved. The only downer for the home team was the modest crowd, as only 12,668 fans watched the semi-final at the St. Jakob-Park.

Zürich (21 April 2014)
Basel's opponents in the Cup final were Zürich, who had beaten Thun in the other semi-final 5–4 in a penalty shoot after a goalless draw. The final was played on Easter Monday in Stade de Suisse with an attendance of 23'312 fans. In the first half, Zürich tried to reduce all risk to zero, Yassine Chikhaoui was the only player who dared to venture forwards occasionally. Davide Callà did have a chance in the 5th minute, but otherwise FCB were also holding back, and neither team reached operating temperatures. Immediately after the break the intensity changed and Callà had a good chance for Basel. At the other end Chikhaoui triggered a first dangerous countermove and seconds later Mario Gavranović missed another good chance. Then Valentin Stocker had a further good chance for Basel. For a long time FCB had been content in neutralizing the game, but suddenly things slipped out of control. Gastón Sauro hesitated at the wrong moment and realised far too late just how serious the situation was. Franck Etoundi rushed past him, Sauro applied the emergency brake and was subsequently shown red. The legitimate dismissal of Sauro, changed the script again. With one man less Basel withdrew themselves again, Zurich continued to operate cleverly and so after 90 minutes it was still goalless. Nine minutes into the extra time, referee Patrick Graf misjudged a controversial scene Giovanni Sio received a yellow-red card, for an alleged acting performance, instead of a penalty for a foul. Outnumbered Basel immediately had a problem and Gavranović put Zürich a goal up. Another four minutes later the same player doubled up.

Conclusion
Zurich won the Swiss Cup for the eighth time in their club's history. With two men more, the FCZ defeated the FCB 2–0 in extra time. Gavranovic was man of the match with his two goals. The losers, with reason, complained about the referee's blunder. Having been runners-up in the previous season, the club's clear aim for the team was for them to win the title. Being runners-up yet again was a big disappointment.

Champions League 
Because Basel entered the Champions League in the qualifying phase their initial aim was to reach the group stage. The draw for the third qualifying round was held on 19 July 2013 at the UEFA headquarters in Nyon. Basel were drawn against Maccabi Tel Aviv

Maccabi Tel Aviv (30 July 2013)
Basel started in their campaign started with the home tie in St. Jakob-Park with an attendance of 12,353 fans against Maccabi Tel Aviv on a sunny summer evening. Basel started well, controlled the game from the very beginning and were dangerous throughout the first period. Philipp Degen often troubled the visitors defence with clever runs down the right and Marcelo Díaz spread the balls out of the centre and he dictated the pace. Valentin Stocker started many slick moves from the left and his goal came on 39 minutes and it seemed only time before more would follow. The hosts came close to adding a second six minutes after half time. Mohamed Salah's cross from the right was deflected by Yoav Ziv, beyond his own keeper. The Maccabi defence were awake and cleared the ball before it crossed the line. Minutes later after a defensive error, Salah again found himself in space and tried to lob the goalkeeper Juan Pablo out of the distance, but the effort went just wide. The visitors' best chance came 20 minutes from time. Rade Prica entered the penalty area from the left and fired a shot that beat FCB keeper Yann Sommer but it rebounded from the crossbar. Stocker's 39th strike provided Basel with the slenderest of leads before the return match a week later.

Return game (6 August 2013)
The return match in the Bloomfield Stadium had an attendance of about 13,000 fans and referee was Clément Turpin of the French Football Federation. The game started very frantic and after just four minutes Maccabi Tel Aviv defender Sheran Yeini tripped Valentin Stocker in the penalty area. Fabian Schär took the spot-kick and converted. On 21 minutes, following an Eran Zahavi error, Mohamed Salah put the visitors two goals up. A long-range drive from Marcelo Díaz on 32 minutes beat home keeper Juan Pablo for the third time. Basel reduced the pace and Maccabi reacted. Barak Yitzhaki had a shot that Basel keeper Yann Sommer parried the ball, but via defender Schär it landed in the net. A good finish from Zahavi another three minutes later pulled a second goal back and after the break Maccabi kept up the pressure. Maharan Radi caught a loose ball and equalised on the hour. After this Paulo Sousa's team ran out of stamina and they lost momentum. Basel controlled the rest of the game and were closer to scoring the winner than the hosts.

Ludogorets Razgrad (21 August 2013)
In the play-off round Basel were drawn against Bulgarian team Ludogorets Razgrad and the first leg was an away game. Ludogorets played their match at Vasil Levski National Stadium, Sofia instead of their regular stadium Ludogorets Arena in Razgrad. The official attendance figure was 11,927. Basel started well into the game and took an early lead as Mohamed Salah sprinted on to a through ball from Fabian Frei to hammer his left footed shot past Vladislav Stoyanov into the net in the 11th minute. Despite the early set back, Ludogorets were still in play. On 22 minutes a good move on the right and Roman Bezjak laid off for Marcelinho, who chipped the ball over the advancing keeper Yann Sommer for the equaliser. Marcelo Díaz had a good chance for the visitors at the end of the first half, but Ludogorets were the better side at this time. After the break the Bulgarian champions took the lead as Ivan Stoyanov's first-time volley from Júnior Caiçara's cross landed in the net in the 50th minute, despite Sommer getting his hand to the ball. Basel reacted, on 59 minutes a long through ball from Marcelo Díaz and again Salah sprinted on to it and pushed the ball past the advancing keeper Stoyanov. Just five minutes later a neat pass from Valentin Stocker between the defenders played Giovanni Sio into space and he made no mistake and put the ball home. Chances followed at both ends, first Marcelinho's header was too high, then Alexandre Barthe hit his shot into the side netting and Salah was denied a hat-trick goal as Júnior Caiçara brought him down after a 50-meter sprint. Referee Wolfgang Stark of the German Football Association showed the defender the red card and on 84 minutes Fabian Schär converted the spot-kick to the final score 4–2 for the visitors.

Return game (27 August 2013)
The St. Jakob-Park had an attendance of 15,733 fans as referee William Collum of the Scottish Football Association blew his whistle for the kick-off for the second leg. Basel's first chance came after Marcelo Díaz's corner was missed by a bunch of players at the near post, the ball bounced and Fabian Frei with a close-range header opened the score card. Ludogorets' equaliser could have come with the next chance, but Ivan Stoyanov hit the cross-bar with his free-kick. At the other end Giovanni Sio rushed into the penalty-area to shoot, but his effort rebounded from the far post. The ball virtually returned to him, but by this time the angle was too acute for him to put it home. The home side dominated the first period, but a dangerous threat of a second goal was not made. The visitors' first chance at goal in the second half came on 65 minutes as a long range shot from Fábio Espinho flew over the top. Finally, 11 minutes from time Matías Delgado's corner was pushed home by Philipp Degen to the final 2–0 score line. Basel brushed their opponents away.

Group stage
With their 6-2 aggregate win Basel qualified for the group stage, thus achieving their initial aim. The draw for the group stage was held in Monaco on 29 August 2013. Basel were drawn into Group E together with Chelsea, Schalke 04 and Steaua București. Chelsea had qualified for the group stage because they had ended the previous Premier League season in third position. Schalke 04 had qualified, after being fourth in the 2012–13 Bundesliga and beating PAOK in the play-off round. Steaua București were champions of the 2012–13 Liga I and via the second qualifying round the won in the play-off round against Legia Warsaw.

Basel had met Chelsea in the semi-final of last season's Europa League but had been beaten in both legs. FCB had already played against Schalke 04 on two earlier occasions, before this stage. The first time was in the 1968 Cup of the Alps, where Basel had lost the tournament's final 1–3 after extra time and the second time was in the 2004–05 UEFA Cup group stage, where the teams had registered a 1–1 draw. This was the first time that Basel had been paired with Steaua București in any European competition. In his summary before the group stage, Basel's head coach Murat Yakin had predicted that the decisive matches would be those against Schalke 04. 

Basel's next main aim was to remain in the competition and reach the knockout phase. The minimum aim was a third position in the group table, this would take them to the 2013–14 Europa League round of 32.

Chelsea (18 September 2013)
Matchday 1 gave FCB an away game in London against group favourites Chelsea. Stamford Bridge had an attendance of 40,358 fans as referee Daniele Orsato of the Italian Football Federation started the game on this cool cloudy evening. The blues started better and pushed the visitors back from the first minutes. Despite the fact that Chelsea had a number of corner-kicks in the early stages, there was no big threats at the visitor's goal. At the same time Basel showed speed and enterprise on their breaks. As time passed, Chelsea began to look sharper and on 25-minutes Frank Lampard took aim and minutes later Eden Hazard made himself room before firing a ball over the top. For the visitors Mohamed Salah had a chance as he veered inside the defenders, but the ball was sent slightly wide. Salah's pace was always a big concern for the Chelsea back four. Directly before the break David Luiz ventured forward, gave a fine pass to Lampard and he slid the ball between the FCB defenders for Oscar, who finished the move off into the far corner beyond the reach of keeper Yann Sommer. After the break it looked like Chelsea could go further ahead, as they made themselves a few more dangerous moves. This failed, but instead, Basel took the opportunity to turn the tables. In the 71st minute a fast, incisive move from the left side of the field and Behrang Safari diagonally passed through the centre of their opponents, one touch football by FCB, Diaz to Streller further to Salah coming from the right and his left-footed finish was immaculate. On 81 minutes Matías Delgado's inswinging corner was headed home at the near post by Streller. Basel came back from behind to defeat Chelsea, with an unexpected 2–1 victory.

Schalke 04 (1 October 2013)
A sold out St. Jakob-Park with an attendance of 33,251 fans was the venue for matchday 2 with Schalke 04 as visitors. Alberto Undiano Mallenco of the Royal Spanish Football Federation was referee. Schalke's head coach Jens Keller had surprised with a starting line-up that featured no recognised striker, with Kevin-Prince Boateng being the most advanced attacking midfielder. At the beginning of the game there was a 5-minute break due to a Greenpeace protest action. In the 11th minute he could have justified his coach's bold tactical twist if he had volleyed home in the early stage, following Fabian Schär's untimely miskick, but the ball flew wide. Apart from this early scare, Basel showed composure, the faster and more fluid football came from them. One good move was as Taulant Xhaka set up Mohamed Salah, who sidestepped the defence and hammered a rising left foot shot, but wide. Salah's pace was always a concern for the Schalke back four. The visitors had a chance, but Roman Neustädter's header went wide. Then Marco Streller with a chance for the hosts, but although his header beat goalkeeper Timo Hildebrand it was also wide of the far post. Especially in the first half, Schalke could hardly be out played. After the break Neustädter missed another chance as his shot hit the crossbar following a counter-arrack. In the 54th minute a corner was cleared out of the area but Julian Draxler was well positioned and elegantly arrowed a half-volley beyond Yann Sommer. Behrang Safari and Schär both sent dipping efforts flying narrowly over Timo Hildebrand's goal. Then Substitute Giovanni Sio then sent a drive toward goal and this forced the Schalke keeper to make an uncomfortable save. Schalke did not admit more to the challenger. For once, strength and inspiration were not enough to upset an exponent from a top league. The 0–1 score remained until the end.

Steaua București (22 October 2013)
The Arena Națională in Bucharest, with an attendance of 23,899 fans, was the location  for the matchday 3 fixture, as Basel were visitors to Steaua București. At least during the opening moments, it was evident that Steaua were willing to correct the zero balance of their first two group stage games as quickly as possible. After 30 seconds, the locals forced the first corner. However, the storm and stress period of the Eastern Europeans did not last too long. The vortex for the first few minutes subsided fairly quickly. FCB started well and Steaua allowed themselves to be pushed back into their own half of the field. Basel, the declared favourites, met exactly the conditions in Bucharest that were to be expected: a lot of ball possession and a limited opponent who actually only lurked on counter-chances. Basel needed little time to adjust to the Romanian champions' impetuous tactics and shifted the dangerous scenes into the opposing half of the pitch. With the change of rhythm of within the FCB team, the challenger suffered considerable problems early on. In the 12th minute Daniel Georgievski cleared a header from Ivanov for his outmanoeuvred keeper off the goal line. Further first-class opportunities came for Safari and Stocker. After half an hour, following a remarkable combination with Captain Marco Streller, Safari's shot only hit the outside of the netting, while the Swiss international hit the crossbar with his shot immediately before the break. At the beginning of the second half Iasmin Latovlevici had a momentous blackout. Streller intercepted the negligent cross-field pass and pushed the ball on, the Chilean Marcelo Diaz chipped the ball perfectly over the powerless goalkeeper Ciprian Tătărușanu. Basel controlled the game and with time running out this strike appeared likely to be enough. Steaua's last chance in the 88th minute appeared out of nowhere, Adrian Popa swung the ball across and substitute Leandro Tatu arrived exactly right to drive the ball home. It was a dramatic end and Basel had a second away victory in the group stage snatched from their grasp. Referee Matej Jug of the Football Association of Slovenia blew the final whistle for this 1–1 draw a few minutes later.

Steaua București (6 November 2013)
Matchday 4, the return game against Steaua București in the St. Jakob-Park had an attendance of 30,704 fans and was not quite sold-out. One carelessness was enough to start a difficult game in a problematic way. Łukasz Szukała surprised the two FCB central defenders Fabian Schär and Ivan Ivanov with a pass over 35 meters. Federico Piovaccari benefited from the lack of timing in the defensive center. He duped Keeper Yann Sommer with the style of a top scorer at the end of this series of Basel mistakes. Practically in return, Fabian Frei had the chance to correct the mishap. However, the defensive playmaker put the ball over the bar. Another chance for Mohamed Salah came, the often refined, but also too inefficient Egyptian preferred the solo instead of the possibly more profitable cross ball to Valentin Stocker. The scene matched the performance: the good intention was recognizable, but the precision was missing, not only at that moment. The home team controlled possession, but developed too little pressure in the centre. On the one hand, there was no idea of how to confront the predictable guests with serious problems; on the other hand, FCB hardly ever developed the dynamism and energy that they had shown in their previous matches. But Salah's pace was always a concern for the Steaua back four. Basel hoped in vain for an input from Matias Delgado, but the number 10 disappointed, until head coach Murat Yakin put an early end to the Argentine's uninspired performance. On 66 minutes Giovanni Sio replaced him. From a Stocker corner, centre-back Ivanov directed an angled header just wide of the far post with goalkeeper Ciprian Tătărușanu beaten. Then the last opening move, just entering into added time, was enough and Basel took a point. Stocker played a good left-footed cross between the central defenders and Sio poked the ball in, to rescue Basel against Steaua. As in the previous meeting between the two teams, the match ended with a 1–1 draw as referee Olegário Benquerença of the Portuguese Football Federation blew the final whistle.

Chelsea (26 November 2013)
The St. Jakob-Park with an attendance of 35,208 fans was the venue for the matchday 5 return game against Chelsea with referee being Stéphane Lannoy of the French Football Federation on this bitterly cold evening. The home team knew that a point would be enough to keep their chance of continuing alive, yet any thoughts of containment were clearly not in their minds. FCB orientated themselves and started against the English top club as they had not started for a long time. FCB dominated, above all, the first half and in the high-class final phase. José Mourinho's world selection, who had stormed to the top of the group with three wins and 10–0 goals since the bad debut in the CL campaign, were demonstrated in phases. Valentin Stocker immediately demonstrated Basel's determination. Seconds after kick-off, he involved the Chelsea defence in the first duel and the first dangerous free kick followed. Keeper Petr Cech had to intervene early and pushed out Taulant Xhaka's direct-kick. The guests were greatly irritated by the force and ingenuity of the FCB tactic and allowed real waves of attacks. The keeper then parried a Fabian Frei effort and was fortunate to see the ball meander away from the onrushing captain Marco Streller. However, the keeper was beaten as an in-swinging corner was headed towards goal by Ivan Ivanov, but was again fortunate because John Obi Mikel was positioned on the line. Chelsea hardly took place in the first half. The superstars did not find room, but primarily they struggled with problems that were becoming increasingly acute. The visitors conceded seven corners in the first 24 minutes. Again and again, Cech saved the Champions League winner from 2012, in the first 45 minutes with brilliant saves from even greater difficulties. The Czech international spectacularly blocked a treacherous shot from Salah with one hand despite the fact that he was already down on his knees.

In the early phase of the second half things equalled out somewhat. But even the introduction of Fernando Torres, in place of the injured Samuel Eto'o, before half-time and further substitute Eden Hazard proved insufficient to get Chelsea going. Basel kept things under control and they continually outmanoeuvred their opponents. Again, towards the end of the game Basel dominated. Then a ball from the left in the 82nd minute, across the field and Mohamed Elneny made an effort at goal, the defence blocked the shot but the loose ball ran towards the onrushing Serey Die, but his shot went inches wide of the left post. On 86 minutes Basel central defender Fabian Schär played a long diagonal ball from the right over the entire Chelsea midfield into the path of Mohamed Salah who sprinted out of their own half down the left flank. Branislav Ivanović had no chance of catching him. Salah's first touch was assured, and his finish lifted delicately over Čech was cool. In added time the last chance belonged to Basel as well. Giovanni Sio lanced their counterattack from the left, his cross was met by Serey Die, but his volley went high. 

At the end the statistics spoke for Basel and the 1–0 victory. Although 51/49% possession, 556/536 passes, Basel had 16 attempts at goal, 10 were on target, Chelsea had one sole attempt in the entire 90 minutes.

Schalke 04 (11 December 2013)
The Veltins-Arena in Gelsenkirchen was sold-out with an attendance of 52,093 fans as Schalke 04 were hosts to Basel on matchday 6. The requirements were clear, Basel had 8 points, Schalke had 7 for Basel a draw would be enough to progress, Schalke needed a win. From the start, the FCB team played the way that a team who wanted to reach the round of 16, should present itself: stylish, calm, serene and, therefore, the pressure from Schalke was not as strong as expected. The first real chance came on 11 minutes, Jefferson Farfán crossed from the right and Taulant Xhaka deflected the cross to his own crossbar. Julian Draxler played the rebound back to Max Meyer, his shot was cleared off the goal line by Fabian Schär.

In the 28th minute, the Schalke captain Benedikt Höwedes brought down the Basel captain Marco Streller. The central defender injured himself during this action and saw the yellow card before he was substituted. Three minutes later, practically an identical situation on the other side, Ádám Szalai was impeded by Ivan Ivanov. The central defender saw the red card and was dismissed by referee Paolo Tagliavento of the Italian Football Federation. Farfán's subsequent free-kick drew a big save from Yann Sommer. The hard red card then gave the game a clear direction. Six minutes after the break Farfán's cross from the right flew over the defenders in the middle of the area, and came to Draxler who, unmarked, finished coolly with a half-volley. On 57 minutes a free-kick from the right and as Farfán played the ball, the defenders all pulled out leaving a wall of five attackers in an off-side position. The referee and his linesman over saw this, Joël Matip had time and space to chest down and side the ball beyond keeper Sommer into the net. After this clear wrong decision, with increasing wear and tear and probably also decreasing motivation of the FCB players, Schalke came to further opportunities being a man more. Basel just played in midfield, let time pass and it remained with the 0–2 defeat.

Conclusion
Chelsea were group winners with four wins and two defeats on 12 points, Schalke took second place with 10 points and Basel were in third position. They thus qualified for the 2013–14 UEFA Europa League round of 32.Therefore, Basel's second aim was not fully achieved, but the minimum aim was accomplished.

Europa League 
The draw for the knockout phase of the Europa League, round of 32, was held at UEFA headquarters in Nyon, Switzerland on 16 December 2013. Basel were drawn against the team that they had eliminated during the qualifying phase of the Champions League Maccabi Tel Aviv and both legs were scheduled for the end of February. The draw for the round of 16 was held on the same occasion. This resulted in that the winners of the Maccabi – FCB match were drawn against the winners of the match Ajax – Red Bull Salzburg. These games were scheduled for 13 and 20 March 2014.

Maccabi Tel Aviv (20 February 2014)
The first meeting at the Bloomfield Stadium last August in the Champions League third qualifying round had been very frantic, the visitors had taken an early three goal lead, the hosts then made a turnaround to achieve the draw. This time in the Europa League round of 32 first leg it was evident that FCB had come to spoil Maccabi's mood. The 13,500 spectators in the sold-out stadium saw the Israelis starting quicker and with more power, but also saw that for the Swiss champions things couldn't go slow and controlled enough. Murat Yakin had nominated three central defenders, Marek Suchy, Arlind Ajeti and Gaston Sauro, into the starting line-up. But first and foremost, FC Basel wanted to survive the first leg without conceding a goal. They played extremely compact with a five-man defense and let no dangers come to Yann Sommer's goal. The only shot on goal in the first half by Barak Yitzhaki, after nine minutes, was no challenge for the Basel goalkeeper. Maccabi, who started the game with vigor, quickly ran out of ideas. The attacks crashed against the Basel concrete for a long time. Basel's only real chance in the first period was as Sauro headed a deep cross toward goal, but also straight into the arms of keeper Juan Pablo. The second period was similarly unadventurous, until the visitor's defender Behrang Safari came close to breaking the stalemate as his free-kick was missed by everyone in the crowded penalty area and flew unexpectedly close beyond the far post. The Basel defence only wavered once in the final stage. The closest Maccabi came to a winning goal was on 72 minutes as Eran Zahavi came forward from an ideal position to finish. Goalie Sommer was present and made a strong rescue. The match ended goalless an obstinate Basel had stifled Maccabi.

Return game (27 February 2014)
The St. Jakob-Park was only half full, with an attendance of just 15,212 spectators, for the second leg against Maccabi Tel Aviv. This was the club's 200th European Cup game. As opposed to the first leg, which had been powerless, slow and controlled, the return game in Basel started fast and forceful. The hosts attempted to get in behind the visitors’ defence at every opportunity. This worked immediately and Basel had two chances in exactly the same number of minutes. Then on 17 minutes as Behrang Safari went wide to the left by-line, he clipped in a cross fot Valentine Stocker who, at the near post, headed the ball against keeper Juan Pablo and into the net. As time passed, the better the Basel offensive got better going forwards. Maccabi, defensively solid, were even more harmless in the forward movements than a week earlier. The Israeli champions tried their luck with either long balls or dribbles, but mostly played too slowly to pose serious problems for the five Basel defenders. The guests' first shot at goal came in the 57th minute, as Maharan Radi tried to finish from ten meters out, but Yann Sommer parried strongly. Three minutes later at the other end Serey Die's perfect centre from the left was headed home by Marco Streller. The Israelis were increasingly overwhelmed. The best example of this, was in the 71st minute, as a header relay first Fabian Frei, then Stocker, led to Streller's second goal of the evening and the 3–0 end score, all three goals scored by head.

Red Bull Salzburg (13 March 2014)
RBSalzburg had beaten Ajax 6 –1 on aggregate in the previous round and were therefore matched against Basel in the round of 16. The first leg was played in the St. Jakob-Park and had an attendance of 17,027 fans. Due to a veritable flood of forfeits, Marco Streller, Behrang Safari, Marcelo Diaz, Kay Voser, Taulant Xhaka, Ivan Ivanov and Fabian Schär were all ruled out due to injury, head coach Murat Yakin had to create a formation with players who had hardly played a role in the autumn. Of the ensemble that had demystified Chelsea twice in the Champions League group stage, only Sommer, Serey Die, Frei and Stocker remained. On the bench next to Mohamed Elneny, the only reasonably successful professional, sat four juniors, including two 17-year-olds without any experience at the highest level. Under these circumstances and because Salzburg had stormed from one success to the next over the past few months, it came as no surprise that the guests demonstrated play without the slightest delay. Salzburg pressed Basel back from the first minute and forced an exceptional early save from Yann Sommer as Stefan Ilsanker's dangerous free-kick evaded a group of players in the area and seemed destined for the far corner of the goal. With the boost of 14 straight victories in a row, Salzburg gained advantage and extended the early pressing phase to a longer period of dominance. Sommer made five/six big saves in the first 20 minutes and the visitors had a number of corner-kicks during this period. At the end Salzburg had a corner ratio of 11 to 2. The hosts were limited to counterattacks and after one Matías Delgado slammed an effort from 15 metres, but this went over. As the first period progressed, they slowly became equal on ball possession. In the first half, Salzburg involved FCB in several tough duels - and not just once, regardless of physical losses. Martin Hinteregger and Stefan Ilsanker definitely did not spare their opponents. Referee Ovidiu Hațegan of the Romanian Football Federation warned them both, but left the cards in his pocket. After the interval both teams were happy to keep the game organised and compact, this tactic limited the amount of the chances for both sides. Salzburg pushed forwards on both wings, but became frustrated by Basel's discipline and robustness and the match became uneventful and toneless. In the closing stages the two 17-year-old FCB juniors Breel Embolo and Albian Ajeti, as substitutes, came to their professional debuts. The goalless score line remained until the final whistle.

Return match (20 March 2014)
The second leg of the tie between RB Salzburg and Basel was played one week later. Due to UEFA sponsorship regulations the Red Bull Arena in Wals-Siezenheim is known as Stadion Salzburg during UEFA club football events. The match had an attendance of 29,320 fans, which meant the stadium was not quite sold out. Basel still had a number of injured players and Salzburg started well into the game. Salzburg had created two first-class chances in the first few minutes. Alan headed over the crossbar in the 3rd minute, then Sadio Mané missed the next opportunity seconds later, before Kevin Kampl missed the ball by a few centimeters. Basel then caught themselves, getting into the game. But on nine minutes didn't run as planned. Marek Suchy, actually intended as head of the Basel defence, made a hard tackle on Alan in the opposing half of the pitch. The referee Manuel Gräfe of the German Football Association dismissed the impetuous Czech without hesitation. The red card accelerated the turbulences. Head coach Murat Yakin reacted immediately with tactical emergency measures, first Fabian Frei moved back, then the coach switched to a back four. In the midst of the general hustle and bustle and FCB disorientation, Jonathan Soriano forced the 1–0, mainly because David Degen was too easily tricked. The Spaniard met Kampl's crisp cross at the far post with a neat volley.

Minutes later, as Salzburg were ready to take a corner-kick and at this point, a few rioters in the FCB fan sector started constantly throwing objects onto the pitch, which compelled the referee to protect the Austrian players and he took the players from the field. Only after the Basel President Heusler urged the out-of-control supporters to reason, via the stadium microphone, did the delicate situation calm down again. Basel fought their way back into the game. But keeper Yann Sommer was forced to make two big saves before the break. Only after Naser Aliji was substituted in on 41 minutes, did the reformed team noticeably curb the Salzburg offensive attacking power. Indeed, after the rearrangements Salzburg had astonishing troubles. However, Salzburg had the first chance after the break, Kampl back-heeled, Mané collected and pushed the ball on to the unmarked Soriano, but he surprisingly shot wide from close range. Next surprise on 50 minutes, corner for Basel, Streller headed the high, hanging delivery beyond Péter Gulácsi's finger tips, high into the top left-hand corner. Next corner on 60 minutes, this came from the left, deep to the far post, keeper Gulácsi stretched without success, and Arlind Ajeti was able to head the ball back across goal and Gastón Sauro headed over the unguarded goal line. Basel had made the turnaround and controlled the game. Salzburg still had astonishing troubles, an example being the second yellow card for Alan, who was dismissed on 86 minutes. Ten-man Basel recovered and stunned Salzburg.

Valencia (3 April 2014)
The draw for the quarter-finals was held on 21 March 2014 and Basel were matched against Valencia. The first leg was played at the St. Jakob-Park with an attendance of just 350 fans. The match was played behind closed doors due to a punishment by the UEFA. The UEFA announced the punishment on 26 March 2014 and ordered that FC Basel 1893 play their next two UEFA home games behind closed doors. The club was also fined €107,000 due to the crowd incidents in the round of 16 second leg away game in the Stadion Salzburg on 20 March. Referee on the day was Martin Atkinson of the FA. Although eight players were out due to injury or suspension, FCB took charge of the game from the start with an impressive, self-evidence. Without exposing themselves to counterattacks or taking great risks, the hosts played themselves towards their opponent's goal. With Valentin Stocker on the left and David Degen on the right, Basel pressured the Valencia defence from the wings, but during the opening period Basel often found themselves limited to attempting with long-range efforts due to the Valencia midfield standing deep. On 34 minutes Serey Die played the ball from the left with a long ball to the right. Good ball control by Philipp Degen, a one/two with Taulant Xhaka, Degen passed inside to Matías Delgado, who set himself up and slammed a right-footed shot from 18 metres with precision across the goalkeeper and into the opposite lower corner of the goal. Valencia were still recovering from this shock as Xhaka stole the ball from an opponent and Stocker was able to hit a delightful cross from the left, allowing Delgado to sneak in behind Jérémy Mathieu and double up four minutes later. Up until Delgado's double strike, the scoring chances resulted from set pieces or long shots. In the first half, FCB had everything under control without any problems. Only in the added time before the interval did a shot cause a trace of danger. In the second period the Spaniards had more possession and created a number of chances. More balls flew through the Basel penalty area than the hosts could have liked. Basel had to defend as intensely as they had suspected against the technically strong visitors. With the two-goal lead behind them this was much easier. Yann Sommer was equal to everything that came at goal and thus the absence of the fans was also manageable. Seconds into added time Fabian Frei won a tackle deep inside his own half played a long low ball into the opponent's half, Stocker, who started his run from his own half, ran onto the ball and played it over the advancing keeper Vicente Guaita to the end result 3–0.

Return match  (10 April 2014)
The second leg of the quarter-final was held at the Mestalla Stadium with an attendance of 33,152 spectators and with Viktor Kassai of the Hungarian Football Federation as referee.
Valencia took control from the start, Basel were pressed back into their own half. Although again eight players were missing due to injury or suspension, it was the visitors who created the first good chance, Serey Die coming from the right into the centre tried a long-distance shot which went slightly wide. Valencia continued to dominate possession, but couldn't create chances at goal, until Marcelo Díaz bad pass in midfield on 38 minutes. João Pereira took possession and lifted a through pass to Alcácer, who expertly chested down and smashed the ball into the net from close range. A corner for the home team on 42 minutes and Eduardo Vargas headed home to double up. To the start of the second period a long free-kick came to Vargas and although he played the ball with his hand he had a shot at goal, which Yann Sommer parried and Vargas put the rebound against the post. On 66 minutes as the ball was being circulated by the Basel defence, Fabian Frei, as last man, was challenged by Alcácer and lost the ball. Alcácer moved forward, but his shot pass deflected by Sommer's fingers onto the crossbar. On 70 minutes inevitable third goal came as Alcácer hammered Vargas's neat cutback left-footed into the net via the crossbar. The home team had levelled the aggregate score and could have won it, but Sommer denied first Alcácer and then Vargas from the winning goal before the final whistle. Extra time was needed and here referee Viktor Kassai of the Hungarian Football Federation had much to do. First yellow for Keita (98), then red and dismissal for Díaz (100), yellow for both Sauro and Vargas (104), second yellow and dismissal for Sauro (105) and finally yellow for Xhaka. The dismissals put the advantage onto the hosts side, although the nine men momentarily silenced the crowd as Serey Die's shot was deflected and went very close, but wide. A cross from the left was deflected in by Alcácer (114), who completed his hattrick, and finally Juan Bernat profited from a defensive mistake (118). Reduced in numbers by two the out for FCB was only a matter of time, but the 0–5 defeat was painful 

Conclusion
Valencia advanced to the semi-final. However, in the stunning climax of the second leg match, they were beaten by Sevilla on the away goals rule. Stéphane Mbia scored in the fourth minute of injury time to give Sevilla the ticket to the final. They then won the competition, beating Benfica in a penalty shoot-out after a goalless 120 minutes.

Instead of advancing to the last 4 for the second time within a year, FCB suffered an almost unprecedented lesson. For the first time ever, a team in the EL lost a three-goal advantage. However, despite their painful quarter-final defeat, Basel's European aims were achieved. In fact, their European journey can be described as being another successful one.

Players

First team squad 
The following is the list of the Basel first team squad. It also includes players that were in the squad the day the season started on 13 July but subsequently left the club after that date.

Out on loan

Transfers Summer 2013

In

Out

Transfers winter 2013/14

In

Out

Results and fixtures

Legend

Friendly matches

Preseason

Uhrencup
The Uhrencup is a club football tournament, held annually in Grenchen.

Winter break

Swiss Super League 

Kickoff times are in CET

First half of season

Second half of season

League table

Results summary

Swiss Cup

UEFA Champions League

Third qualifying round

Basel won 4–3 on aggregate.

Play-off round

Group stage

UEFA Europa League

Knockout phase

Round of 32
The draw was held on 16 December 2013. The first legs were played on 20 February and the second legs were played on 27 February 2014.

Basel won 3–0 on aggregate.

Round of 16
The draw was held on 16 December 2013. The first legs were played on 13 March and the second legs were played on 20 March 2014.

Basel won 2–1 on aggregate.

Quarter-finals
The draw was held on 21 March 2014. The first leg played on 3 April and the second leg played on 10 April 2014.

Valencia won 5–3 on aggregate.

Notes

Squad statistics

Appearances and goals

|-
! colspan="15" style="background:#dcdcdc; text-align:center"| Goalkeepers

|-
! colspan="15" style="background:#dcdcdc; text-align:center"| Defenders

|-
! colspan="15" style="background:#dcdcdc; text-align:center"| Midfielders

|-
! colspan="15" style="background:#dcdcdc; text-align:center"| Forwards

|-
|colspan="15" style="background:#dcdcdc; text-align:center"|Players who appeared for Basel but are no longer at the club

See also
 History of FC Basel
 List of FC Basel players
 List of FC Basel seasons

References

Sources
 Rotblau: Jahrbuch Saison 2015/2016. Publisher: FC Basel Marketing AG. 
 Rotblau: Jahrbuch Saison 2017/2018. Publisher: FC Basel Marketing AG. 
 Die ersten 125 Jahre / 2018. Publisher: Josef Zindel im Friedrich Reinhardt Verlag, Basel. 
 Season 2013–14 at "Basler Fussballarchiv” homepage
 Switzerland 2013–14 at RSSSF

External links
 

Basel
Basel
FC Basel seasons